This is a list of colleges and universities in Greater St. Louis. It includes public and private schools.

Traditional colleges and universities
Fontbonne University
Harris-Stowe State University
Lindenwood University
Maryville University
McKendree University
Missouri Baptist University
Principia College
Saint Louis University
Southern Illinois University Edwardsville
University of Missouri–St. Louis 
Washington University in St. Louis
Webster University

Satellite campuses
Central Methodist University 
Columbia College

Special focus colleges and universities
Goldfarb School of Nursing at Barnes-Jewish College
Logan University
Ranken Technical College *
University of Health Sciences and Pharmacy in St. Louis

Note * = Unlike most career/trade schools, Ranken Technical College is a fully accredited not-for-profit institution offering associate and baccalaureate degrees.

Community and junior colleges
East Central College (5 campuses)
Jefferson College (Missouri) (4 campuses)
Lewis and Clark Community College (2 campuses)
St. Charles Community College
St. Louis Community College (4 campuses, 2 education centers)
Southwestern Illinois College (3 campuses)

Seminaries
Aquinas Institute of Theology
Concordia Seminary
Covenant Theological Seminary
Eden Theological Seminary
Kenrick-Glennon Seminary
Urshan Graduate School of Theology

Bible colleges
Brookes Bible College
Midwest University
St. Louis Christian College
St. Louis Theological Seminary
Urshan College

Business, career, and trade schools
Chamberlain College of Nursing
Lutheran School of Nursing
Midwest Institute
St. Louis College of Health Careers
Stevens Institute of Business and Arts

See also
Education in St. Louis, Missouri
Education in Greater St. Louis

References

Education in Greater St. Louis
St. Louis